Lashmar Conservation Park is a protected area located on the north coast of Dudley Peninsula on Kangaroo Island in South Australia about  south-east of Penneshaw.  It was proclaimed under the National Parks and Wildlife Act 1972 in 1993. The Lashmar Lagoon which is considered to be a significant wetland is located within the boundaries of the conservation park.  The conservation park is classified as an IUCN Category III protected area.

References

External links
Entry for Lashmar Conservation Park on protected planet

Conservation parks of South Australia
Protected areas established in 1993
1993 establishments in Australia
Dudley Peninsula